José Luis Perales Morillas (born 18 January 1945) is a Spanish singer and songwriter. He has recorded 27 albums and 50 million copies sold worldwide. His compositions have been recorded by singers such as Vikki Carr, Bertín Osborne, Raphael, Rocío Jurado, Jeanette, Miguel Bosé, Daniela Romo, Isabel Pantoja, Julio Iglesias, Paloma San Basilio, Mocedades, La Oreja de Van Gogh, Ricardo Montaner and Marc Anthony, among others.

Perales has given concerts in Uruguay, Mexico, Venezuela, Colombia, Argentina, Chile, Costa Rica, Puerto Rico, Dominican Republic, United States, Brazil, Italy, France, and Portugal. His most popular singles are "Quisiera Decir tu Nombre", "¿Y cómo es él?" and "¿Qué Pasará Mañana?".

Biography 
From a very young age, Perales displayed an interest in music. At age 6, he learned to play the lute. At 16, Perales studied to be an electrical technician at the Universidad Laboral of Sevilla on a scholarship. During his time at university, he learned how to play the guitar and realized that music was going to form part of his life. After university, Perales moved to Madrid, where he completed his studies and continued his interest in music. His initial career as a musician was as a composer, because he did not like to sing and was unsure of the support of his girlfriend, Manuela. Encouraged by his mother, Mariana, Perales sang  at some local festivals in his hometown.
However, it was not until he met Rafael Trabucchelli (an influential Italian music producer in Spain at the time) in 1970 that his musical career took a dramatic turn. Trabucchelli discovered the young composer and talented, but reluctant, singer.

Perales composed "Porque te vas", which was performed by Jeanette and sold 4 million copies worldwide in 1976. After much encouragement from Trabucchelli and his supporters, Perales decided to give singing a try.  His first record, "Celos de mi Guitarra" (Jealous of my Guitar) was a huge success in Spain and in Latin America. Although it was difficult for Perales to leave his job and devote himself to his new career, he was able to find a way to integrate his musical career into his life. He still lives in Castejón with his wife Manuela, son Pablo, and daughter Maria.

On 18 February 2019 he received the Medalla de Oro al Mérito en las Bellas Artes.

Discography 
1973 – Mis Canciones (My Songs)
1974 – El Pregón (The Pregon)
1975 – Para Vosotros Canto (For You I Sing)
1976 – Por Si Quieres Conocerme (In Case You want To know Me)
1978 – Como La Lluvia Fresca (Like Fresh Rain)
1978 – Soledades (Edition Just For Latinamerica) (Solitudes)
1979 – Tiempo De Otoño (Time of Autumn)
1981 – Nido De Águilas (Eagle's Nest)
1982 – Entre El Agua Y El Fuego (Between the Water and the Fire)
1984 – Amaneciendo En Ti (Waking Up to You)
1986 – Con El Paso Del Tiempo (With the Passage of Time)
1986 – Que Canten los Ninos (Let The Children Sing)
1988 – Sueño De Libertad (Dream of Freedom)
1989 – La Espera (The Wait)
1990 – A Mis Amigos (To My Friends)
1991 – América (America)
1993 – Gente Maravillosa (Wonderful People)
1996 – En Clave De Amor (In The Key of Love)
1998 – Quédate Conmigo (Stay with Me)
2000 – Me Han Contado Que Existe Un Paraíso (They've Told me that there's a Paradise)
2006 – Navegando Por Ti (Sailing Across You)
2012 – Calle Soledad (Street of Loneliness)
2016 – Calma (album) (Calm)

References

External links 
  
Biography
[ allmusic biography]

1945 births
Living people
People from the Province of Cuenca
Spanish male singers
Spanish Roman Catholics
Singers from Castilla–La Mancha
Latin music songwriters
Spanish songwriters